Pardeesville is a census-designated place (CDP) in Hazle Township, Luzerne County, Pennsylvania, United States. The population was 572 at the 2010 census.

Geography

It uses the Hazleton zip code of 18202.

Demographics

References

Census-designated places in Luzerne County, Pennsylvania
Census-designated places in Pennsylvania